Cash money may refer to:

 Money, financial currency; the term "cash money" sometimes disambiguates printed currency from other non-physical financial instruments.

Music
 Cash Money (song) by Tyga
 Cash Money Records, a New Orleans-based record label
Cash Money Millionaires, a term to describe rappers affiliated with Cash Money Records
 "Cash Money", a song by MC Solaar from the 2003 album Mach 6
 "Cashmoney", a 2019 song by No Rome
 DJ Cash Money, Philadelphia-based hip hop DJ